Steveston-London Secondary School (SLSS) is a public high school in Richmond, British Columbia for  pupils grades 8-12.  Steveston-London Secondary follows the semester course system.

Origin

Before the establishment of Steveston-London Secondary School, Steveston Secondary School and Charles E. London Secondary School were two high schools close together. However, both schools were merged into one because of declining enrollment. The name "Steveston-London Secondary School" was chosen on June 14, 2006 as decided in a student vote from both schools.

Steveston-London Secondary School occupies the same building as Charles E. London Secondary School had, with a new 19 million dollars renovation from the Government of British Columbia. The new addition consists of a second floor science wing as well as 9 classrooms and 2 laboratories. Other additions include a library, theater, music room, and an additional gymnasium and counseling area. Many classrooms, such as Charles E. London's former gymnasium, have been renovated. The former Steveston Secondary School building was demolished over the course of mid-2015 to Summer 2016 and replaced with a new residential development.

School Information

School hours are from →8:30 a.m. to 3:00 p.m←. The first class of the day begins at 8:30 a.m. Each school day consists of a 80-minute periods with 10-minute breaks. Steveston-London Secondary School uses the semester system.

Feeder schools
Steveston-London Secondary School is a public school available for students that are in grade 8-12. Its current feeder schools are Blundell Elementary, Errington Elementary, Maple Lane Elementary, James McKinney Elementary, Westwind Elementary and Jessie Wowk Elementary.
Also, many students from other elementary schools choose to attend Steveston-London because of its proximity to their place of residence.

Academic enrichment opportunities
At Steveston-London, it is recognized that students learn in a variety of ways as well as at different rates. Therefore, enrichment opportunities are offered to highly motivated, gifted or underachieving students.

Enrichment Programs

Spectrum Program

Spectrum is a 3-year enrichment program (Grades 8-10) designed and geared towards students with high motivation as well as strong abilities inside and outside the classroom.  Spectrum students take the core curriculum courses of Science, Mathematics, Social Studies, and English together and explore enrichment topics that vary according to different subject areas and grade levels.  The courses taken with the Spectrum group are scheduled according to the linear course system and not the semester system.

Athletics
Steveston-London competes in the RSSAA leagues and enters teams in all of the traditional fall, winter and spring sport seasons.
The following sports are available:

In 2009, The Junior Boys' Volleyball Team won the Richmond cup and in 2010 and 2011 the Bantam (Grade 8) Boys' Volleyball Teams won the Richmond cup.

In 2012, the Senior Boys' Volleyball Team won the Capilano Blues Classic and received an Honourable Mention in the provincial rankings.

In 2013, the Senior Boys' Volleyball Team won a bronze medal at the UBC 49th Annual Mizuno Invitational Tournament.

In 2014, the Senior Boys' Volleyball Team won the RSSAA and Lower Mainland Championships and came 4th place in the BC Provincial Championships.

In 2016, the Senior Boys' Basketball Team placed 2nd in the "AAA" BC Provincial Tournament

In 2017, the Bantam Girls' Basketball Team won the RSSAA championship, V&DIHSAA championship, and placed second at the BC Provincial Championship. 

In 2018, the Juvenile Girls' Basketball Team won the RSSAA championship, V&DIHSAA championship, and Provincial Championships. 

Intramurals are also available to all students.  One or more activities are available daily at lunchtime. Example recreational leagues include 3-on-3 basketball, flag football, volleyball, indoor soccer, cosom hockey, table tennis, and softball.

Notable alumni
 Fardaws Aimaq, basketball player

Sources
Steveston-London Secondary Official Website
Steveston-London Map, Live Maps
 John Yap MLA, Presents Steveston-London
Steveston Alumni
School District Development Objectives
Enrollment Reports
Steveston-London Alumni

References

High schools in Richmond, British Columbia
Educational institutions established in 2007
2007 establishments in British Columbia